Bastionder is a small military museum and information center built into Bastion 'Oranje' in 's-Hertogenbosch, the Netherlands.

Bastion Oranje  
The Bastionder's first exhibit, the Bastion Oranje, was built in 1634 by the Dutch Republic after they conquered 's-Hertogenbosch in 1629. The Republic's subsequent review of the defense of 's-Hertogenbosch found that the distance between the two existing bastions - the 'Vught' and 'Baselaar' bastions - was too great to be defended only by the late-fourteenth-century tower located at the corner of the city wall, so they decided to add the Bastion 'Oranje'. 

At the time Bastion Oranje was a polygonal bastion much like the others, except that its name referred to the city's new masters. The walls were two meters thick, and the bastion was built to mount heavy artillery. It was built around the old medieval tower; though this practice was not unusual at the time, few examples still survive today. Later, the bastion would serve as the base for a windmill, a very common feature of city walls. In the early nineteenth century, an oil mill and floor factory with a 65-hp steam engine were built on the bastion.

After 1874, the bastion was no longer needed as a defensive work. It could not simply be demolished because the city walls functioned as a dike, as they still do today. In 1885, the municipality bought the grounds of the Bastion Oranje, and the factory was demolished. In 1888, about 2,000 m3 of the earth was removed from the bastion in order to create the small park it holds today. The park, with large trees and a view over the Bossche Broek nature reserve,  still attracts many visitors due to its proximity to the city center. 

Over the years, a number of old cannons were placed in the park. One of these guns was the unique 'Stuerghewalt' or 'Boze Griet' gun, which is mounted on two small stones rather than the gun-carriages used for most other guns. While this may appear to be a relic of the old defensive position, it is actually a modern addition; the bastion was originally covered by an earth wall with gun emplacements, which was removed in 1888. Furthermore, guns were not left to corrode on the walls but were only placed there when the enemy approached. The comparable nearby Bastion 'Sint Antonie' shows the upper structure and gun emplacements that have been removed from Bastion Oranje.

Bastionder  

The Bastionder project originally aimed to display the tower and part of the city wall in an underground visitor center called Bastionder. The tower in question had been pulled down and filled with sand around 1590 so that guns could be placed on top of it. Old maps showed that the old tower had been left in place after the construction of Bastion Oranje, and preliminary excavations found it in relatively good condition at the corner of the city walls. A stair and three gun ports were also found in the tower. One of these late medieval gun ports, which had a saw profile to stop bullets from ricocheting inwards, has been re-opened as an example for visitors to see.

The name 'Bastionder' is a portmanteau of the Dutch words 'Bastion' and 'Onder' (under). The project excavated part of the underground area between the bastion's walls and the old city wall, covering it with a weathering steel and concrete roof with some windows. One of the requirements for the Bastionder was that it should disturb the existing park as little as possible. To meet this requirement, the roof only rises above ground level enough to provide a visitors' entrance. The roof is also covered with grass planted with crocuses, making it look like part of the park. 

The construction created a substantial space for visitors to see the old city wall and tower. Some informational signs and a video presentation about the history of fortress 's-Hertogenbosch were added, creating a small visitor center. It is a convenient start/endpoint for city walks, expeditions to the Bossche Broek, and for popular boat trips on the Binnendieze. What makes the Bastionder a museum is that, apart from the buildings themselves, it exhibits exactly one artifact: the unique wrought-iron cannon 'Stuerghewalt' cannon, also known as 'Boze Griet'.

Stuerghewalt 

The 'Stuerghewalt' or 'Boze Griet' long cannon, located inside the Bastionder, is a large wrought iron cannon. As such, it is unique in the Netherlands and very rare in Europe. Its unusual production method is visible in the many-sided shape of the barrel, a result of using wrought iron instead of cast iron. It dates from 1511-1512 when cast guns were only made from bronze. The first cast-iron cannon in Europe was made in 1543.  

Stuerghewalt is the longest surviving medieval or early modern cannon in Europe. It also happens to be the only surviving wrought iron cannon in the Netherlands. 

The cannon's name, 'Stuerghewalt' ('Stoer geweld' in modern Dutch), means something like 'rough violence'. Its other name, 'Boze Griet', translates roughly to 'furious girl'. "Griet', or girl, was a common feature of gun names at the time; other examples include Ghent's Dulle Griet or 'mad wife', which shares a name with Pieter Bruegel the Elder's painting Dull Gret.

References

External links 
 

Museums in 's-Hertogenbosch